KFNX (1100 AM) is a news/talk radio station licensed to Cave Creek, Arizona, and broadcasting out of Phoenix, Arizona. It features conservative-leaning talk programs, paid health, Pet Behavior and financial programs, and it is also the Phoenix market's broadcaster for University of Arizona Wildcats football and basketball. KFNX syndicated lineup includes Joe Pags, Dan Bongino, Lars Larson, and Alex Jones. They were voted one of the top ten radio stations in Arizona by Ranking Arizona and they have over 50,000 listeners a week. They feature five of the top ten talk shows in the country. They have local news updates every half-hour from the KFNX news department, and recently added top-of-the-hour news updates from CBS News Radio, after previously featuring updates from TheBlaze Radio Network (founded by conservative talk show host Glenn Beck). KFNX also features traffic reports and local weather forecasts with former KTVK weatherman (and former Arizona Lottery drawing host) Jim Howl.

History 
The station was originally proposed by Peter V. Gureckis of Rockville, Maryland, doing business as Cave Creek Broadcasting Company. A construction permit was awarded to Gureckis on June 4, 1991, and the KCCF call letters assigned on July 12, 1991. Gureckis enlisted Phoenix broadcast executive Ray Cox to build and sign on the station, with the target format of adult standards. After six years of delays in securing a transmitter site, KCCF signed on June 27, 1997, with a full-service middle of the road format helmed by veteran DJ Bill Heywood instead of the adult standards/big band format Cox originally wanted. Being a new music station on the AM dial was an uphill battle for KCCF, especially when most music formats had shifted to FM by 1997. They did not show up in the Arbitron ratings. Gureckis sold his stake in KCCF in early 1998 to Broadcast Development, LLC (partially owned by Cox), but that ownership wouldn't last long.

On June 8, 1998, Cox sold KCCF for $5.5 million to North American Broadcasting Company, headed by Francis Battaglia, who promptly changed the format to brokered talk as a part-time simulcast of Battaglia's existing station, WALE in Providence, Rhode Island. On August 3, 1998, the station changed to the current call sign, KFNX. In 2004, new general manager Mike Barna reduced the amount of brokered hours and added more local hosts. Barna left the station within a year, and later became owner of classic country station KSWG in Wickenburg. The station shifted back to a format of syndicated and brokered talk.

In 2005, after years of operating in Chapter 11 bankruptcy, Battaglia sold a majority stake in KFNX to Lyle Campbell, reorganizing North American into Premier Radio Stations, LLC (not related to iHeartMedia-owned Premiere Networks). The format was not changed, and Battaglia still ran the station. Campbell filed for personal Chapter 7 bankruptcy, and in 2017, control of the station was reverted to a trustee.

On June 14, 2019, the bankruptcy trustee sold KFNX to Futures and Options, Inc., headed by William Brady of Jupiter, Florida, pending FCC and bankruptcy court approval. Futures and Options closed on its deal on November 5 of the same year. Futures and Options is now the sole owner and operator. Soon afterward, KFNX affiliated with CBS News Radio and began featuring its top-of-the-hour news updates as well as audio rebroadcasts of Face the Nation and 60 Minutes.

References

External links 
 Official Station Website
 KFNX Program Schedule

FNX
News and talk radio stations in the United States
Radio stations established in 1997
1997 establishments in Arizona